William la Zouche, 1st Baron Zouche (1276/86–1352), lord of the manor of Harringworth in Northamptonshire, was an English baron and soldier who fought in the Wars of Scottish Independence. He is referred to in history as "of Harringworth" to distinguish him from his first cousin (of the senior line) Alan la Zouche, 1st Baron la Zouche (1267–1314) of Ashby de la Zouch in Leicestershire.

Ancestry
William was the son of Eudo la Zouche (d. 1279) by his wife Millicent de Cantilupe (d. 1299), widow of John de Mohaut, daughter of William III de Cantilupe by his wife Eva de Braose, 3rd daughter and co-heiress of William de Braose, Baron Bergavenny. Millicent de Cantilupe was a great heiress, being a co-heir to her brother George de Cantilupe (d. 1273), Baron Bergavenny, feudal baron of Totnes in Devon (formerly held by de Braose), she was heiress of the English feudal barony of Eaton Bray (formerly held by Cantilupe) and of the manor of Harringworth, amongst many other lands.

William's younger brother was Roger la Zouch, Lord of Lubbesthorpe (d. 1303), father of Roger la Zouch the instigator of the murder of Roger de Beler in 1326. William's sister, Eva la Zouch, was married to the rebel Maurice de Berkeley, 2nd Baron Berkeley who was imprisoned in Wallingford Castle and died there also in 1326. Another sister, Lucy la Zouch, married Sir Thomas Greene of Boughton, Northamptonshire: her grandson Sir Henry Green the younger was an intimate associate of King Richard II, and as such was executed by Henry IV as one of Richard's "evil councillors".

Career and life
William inherited the manor of Harringworth, including a park and wood, upon the death of his mother Millicent de Cantilupe in 1299.

William was summoned to Parliament by writ as Baron Zouche of Harringworth from 1308 to 1325 and to serve against the Scottish from 1314 (after the disastrous Battle of Bannockburn) to 1317.

William was pardoned for his role in the death of Piers Gaveston in October 1313 but made a Conservator of the Peace in Northamptonshire from 1317 to 1321 and ordered to suppress illegal meetings.

In February 1322, William was ordered to muster as many men-at-arms and foot soldiers as he could and to march to the King to aid in the suppression of the rebels of Thomas, 2nd Earl of Lancaster. William declined and sent two men-at-arms in June, claiming ill health as his excuse.

Later in 1322, William was summoned to serve against the Scots and against Lancaster's rebels. He was summoned to defend Aquitaine in 1324, which was lost under the poor leadership of Hugh le Despenser, 1st Earl of Winchester, and to go to Gascony in 1325.

After Queen Isabella and Roger Mortimer, 1st Earl of March's successful overthrow of her husband, Edward II, William was summoned to the Parliament held in January 1327 which decided it had lost confidence in the rule of Edward and forced his abdication.

William died on 10 March 1352. Inquisition post mortems found he held land in Shropshire, Wiltshire, Norfolk, Bedfordshire, Buckinghamshire, Rutland, Warwickshire, Leicestershire, Lincolnshire, Northamptonshire and Worcestershire.

Family
William married Maud Lovel (d. 1346), daughter of John Lovel, 1st Baron Lovel of Titchmarsh.

By her, William had at least ten children including:

 Elizabeth la Zouche (c.1284–1311), m. Sir Oliver de Ingham
 Eudo la Zouche (1297/8 – April 1326, Paris) m. Joan, daughter and heiress of William Inge (judge). Succeeded by his son William la Zouche, 2nd Baron Zouche.
 William la Zouche
 John la Zouche, elder
 Roger la Zouche
 Thomas la Zouche
 John la Zouche, younger
 Edmund la Zouche
 Millicent la Zouche m. William Deyncourt
 Isabel la Zouche
 Thomasina la Zouche
 Maude le Zouche (c.1290 – 31 May 1349), m. Sir Thomas Mallory, Knight (c.1287–1318)  and had one child together: Sir Christopher Mallory, Lord of Hutton Conyers, York (c.1317–c.1378) who married Joan, (daughter of Robert Conveyers, of Hougton Convyers).

References

Bibliography
Ancestors of Scott Wolter ~ Volume 2, Family Groups by Diana Jean Muir (2018) p. 234 – "Sir Thomas Mallory and Maud le Zouch, daughter of William Mortimer le Zouche and wife Maud Lovel. . . "
 
 
 
 
 
 
 

1277 births
1352 deaths
13th-century English people
14th-century English nobility
English MPs 1308–09
People from Leicestershire
English MPs 1325
Barons Zouche
People from North Northamptonshire
English people of the Wars of Scottish Independence
Lords of Glamorgan